Sherlock (also Sherlock Station) is an unincorporated community in Lipscomb County, Texas, United States.

Notes

Unincorporated communities in Lipscomb County, Texas
Unincorporated communities in Texas